The 2016 Samford Bulldogs football team represented Samford University in the 2016 NCAA Division I FCS football season. They were led by second year head coach Chris Hatcher and played their home games at Seibert Stadium. They were a member of the Southern Conference. They finished the season 7–5, 5–3 in SoCon play to finish in fourth place. They received an at-large bid to the FCS Playoffs where they lost to Youngstown State in the first round.

Schedule

Game summaries

Mars Hill

At Central Arkansas

At Chattanooga

Wofford

At Furman

VMI

Western Carolina

At Mississippi State

At The Citadel

Mercer

At East Tennessee State

FCS playoffs

First round – Youngstown State

Ranking movements

References

Samford
Samford Bulldogs football seasons
Samford
Samford Bulldogs football